Shamil Magomedovich Zavurov (born July 4, 1984) is a retired Russian mixed martial artist of Avar descent, who competes in the Welterweight and Lightweight divisions. A professional MMA competitor since 2004, he is the former M-1 Global World Welterweight champion.

Early life
Zavurov attended high school in Makhachkala, the capital of Dagestan, where he began training in freestyle wrestling under Mairbek Yusupov (member of the 1977-78 USSR team who went on to coach Dagestan’s freestyle wrestling team).  Post-school, he studied at the Dagestan State Pedagogical University, graduating from the Faculty of Physical Culture and Sports and also studied law at the Dagestan Institute of Finance and Law.  He continued working on his martial arts training, taking up Combat Sambo, and also started a family – he is married with two sons and a daughter. He likes to employ the techniques of Georges St-Pierre, whom he is a fan of. Zavurov is undefeated in combat sambo (153-0)

Mixed martial arts career
Shamil Zavurov has achieved a great deal of success in combat sports.  In addition to more than 50 victories in amateur and semi-professional MMA, he has triumphed more than 50 times in Combat Sambo bouts, in the process winning three world championships (2004, 2005, and 2007). He has also won international tournaments in Wushu Sanda (2003) and wrestling and was the 2002 Dagestani champion in Wushu Sanda in the youth division.  In 2005 and 2007, he won Russian national championships and was twice the CIS champion in hand-to-hand combat.

The hardest fight in Zavurov's career was his unanimous decision victory over Seydina Seck in which his arm was broken and he sustained torn ligaments – these injuries still cause him pain.  Zavurov still wonders about the only defeat of his career, a split decision loss to Rashid Magomedov, which was controversial in that commentators and viewers disagreed with the judges' decision.  It was Zavurov's first fight in more than a year, his return after a serious injury he sustained after being drafted into the army.

In fighting in the Eastern European M-1 Welterweight tournament, Zavurov defeated Radik Iboyan with a second round technical knockout and won a hard-fought semi-final against Ramazan Abdulzhalilov that went the full distance.  In the tournament final, Zavurov defeated Magomedrasul Khasbulaev with a "text-book rear-naked-choke submission."  Since winning the tournament, Zavurov has compiled four further victories in a single three-week period, against Vladimir Katyihin, Vasily Novikov, Vener Galiev, and Jaroslav Poborsky.

M-1 Global
Shamil Zavurov was expecting to face Tom "Da Tank" Gallicchio, the Americas selection champion, for the title but Gallicchio was removed following "an infringement of contractual obligations".  Gallicchio was replaced by Abner Lloveras, the Western European M-1 Global tournament victor. Zavurov defeated Lloveras via fourth-round TKO to become the inaugural M-1 Global Welterweight Champion.

In the event’s second championship bout, Russian Shamil Zavurov edged 2010 World Victory Road welterweight grand prix runner-up Yasubey Enomoto in a five-round affair.

Zavurov was scheduled to rematch his lone defeat as he was to defend his title against Rashid Magomedov at M-1 Challenge XXX on December 9, 2011.  The match, however, has been postponed and Zavurov instead faced Yasubey Enomoto in a rematch.  He lost the back-and-forth battle via submission in the fifth round.

Zavurov faced Alexander Yakovlev on March 16, 2012 at M-1 Challenge 31, with the fight ending in a draw (judges scorecards: 29–28 Zavurov, 28–28, 28–28)

Bellator Fighting Championships
Zavurov signed with Bellator MMA and was reported to take part in Bellator MMA: Season Eight. However, for reasons unexplained, did not take part in any event of the season.

World Fighting Championship Akhmat
Zavurov faced Brazilian Rodrigo Caporal in the quarterfinal at WFCA 16 on March 12, 2016. He won the fight via unanimous decision.

Zavurov faced to Luciano Palhano at  WFCA 22 on May 22, 2016. He won the fight via unanimous decision.

Zavurov faced Chechen super star Khusein Khaliev at WCFA 23 Lightweight Grand Prix on October 4, 2016. He lost the fight via knockout in the second round.

Road Fighting Championship
In early 2017, Zavurov entered Road Fighting Championship's Road FC $1 Million Dollar Lightweight Tournament. In the International Trials, he face Won Ki Kim at Road FC 036 on February 11, 2017. He won the fight by unanimous decision to enter the tournament.

In the opening round, Zavurov faced Leo Kuntz at Road FC 040 on July 15, 2017. He again won by unanimous decision. In the quarterfinals, he faced Khuukhenkhuu Amartuvshin Road FC 044 on November 11, 2017. He won the fight by unanimous decision. In the semifinals, Zavurov faced Ronys Torres at Road FC 046 on March 10, 2018. He again won by unanimous decision to make it to the tournament final. He lost to Mansour Barnaoui at Road FC 052 on February 23, 2019.

Gorilla Fighting Championship
After the Road FC tournament, Zavurov was scheduled to fight Matias Juarez at GFC 11 on May 3, 2019. However, the bout was cancelled. Then, Zavurov was booked to face Phil Baroni at GFC 14 on July 13, 2019. In turn, Baroni withdrew from the fight and was replaced by his formerly scheduled opponent Juarez. Zavurov won the fight via unanimous decision.

Zavurov was then scheduled to face Ivica Trušček at GFC 17 on September 27, 2019. Trušček withdrew from the bout due to an unknown reason.

Return to Road FC
He then returned to the Road FC, facing A Sol Kwon at Road FC 56 on November 9, 2019. He won the fight via unanimous decision.

Return to GFC
Zavurov's bout with Trušček was rebooked to take place at GFC 20 on November 23, 2019. Zavurov won the bout via technical knockout in the third round.

After a year away from competition, Zavurov then faced Renato Gomes at UAE Warriors 15 on January 15, 2021. Zavurov knocked Gomes down in the first round enroute to decision victory.

Zavurov faced Ricardo Tirloni at Eagle Fighting Championship 37 on June 18, 2021. He won the bout via TKO due to ground and pound in the second round.

Zavurov faced Nariman Abbasov on September 17, 2021 at AMC Fight Nights: Abdulmanap Nurmagomedov Memory Tournament. He got knocked out in the first round and retired after the bout.

Championships and accomplishments

Mixed martial arts
M-1 Global
M-1 Selection 2010 Eastern Europe Welterweight
M-1 Global Welterweight Championship (One time; former)
Two successful title defenses
Euro-Asia Champion (One time)
One successful title defense
Octagon Fighting Sensation
OFS Welterweight Championship (one time; former)
One successful title defense

Sambo
Federation International Amateur de Sambo
Combat Sambo World champion (Three-time)
All-Russian Sambo Federation
Russian Combat Sambo National Championships 21st (2010)

Mixed martial arts record

|-
|Loss
| align=center| 40–7–1
|Nariman Abbasov
|KO (punches)
|AMC Fight Nights: Abdulmanap Nurmagomedov Memory Tournament
|
|align=center|1
|align=center|4:13
|Moscow, Russia
|
|-
|Win
| align=center| 40–6–1
|Ricardo Tirloni
|TKO (punches)
|Eagle Fighting Championship 37
|
|align=center|2
|align=center|2:12
|Almaty, Kazakhstan
|
|-
|Win
| align=center| 39–6–1
| Renato Gomes
| Decision (unanimous)
| UAE Warriors 15 & EFC 32
| 
| align=center| 3
| align=center| 5:00
| Abu Dhabi, United Arab Emirates
| 
|-
| Win
| align=center| 38–6–1
| Ivica Trušček
| TKO
| GFC 20
| 
| align=center| 3
| align=center| 3:13
| Tashkent, Uzbekistan
|
|-
| Win
| align=center| 37–6–1
| A-Sol Kwon
| Decision (unanimous)
| Road FC 56
| 
| align=center| 3
| align=center| 5:00
| Yeosu, South Korea
|
|-
| Win
| align=center| 36–6–1
| Matias Juarez
| Decision (unanimous)
| GFC 14 
| 
| align=center| 3
| align=center| 5:00
| Kaspiysk, Russia
|
|-
| Loss
| align=center| 35–6–1
| Mansour Barnaoui
| KO (flying knee)
| Road FC 052
| 
| align=center| 3
| align=center| 0:30
| Seoul, South Korea
| 
|-
| Win
| align=center| 35–5–1
| Ronys Torres
| Decision (unanimous)
| Road FC 046
| 
| align=center| 3
| align=center| 5:00
| Seoul, South Korea
| 
|-
| Win
| align=center| 34–5–1
| Khuukhenkhuu Amartuvshin
| Decision (unanimous)
| Road FC 044
| 
| align=center| 3
| align=center| 5:00
| Shijiazhuang, Hebei, China
| 
|-
| Win
|  align=center| 33–5–1
| Leo Kuntz
| Decision (unanimous)
| Road FC 040
| 
| align=center| 3
| align=center| 5:00
| Seoul, South Korea
| 
|-
| Win
|  align=center| 32–5–1
| Jorge Rodrigues
| Decision (unanimous)
| WFCA 38: Battle in Grozny 
| 
| align=center| 3
| align=center| 5:00
| Grozny, Russia
| 
|-
| Win
|  align=center| 31–5–1
| Won Ki Kim
| Decision (unanimous)
| Road FC 036
| 
| align=center| 3
| align=center| 5:00
| Seoul, South Korea
| 
|-
| Win
|  align=center| 30–5–1
| Bagautdin Abasov
| Decision (unanimous)
| OFS 10: The Heroes Return
| 
| align=center| 3
| align=center| 5:00
| Yaroslavl, Russia
| 
|-
|  Loss
|  align=center| 29–5–1
| Khusein Khaliev
| KO (knee)
| WFCA 23: Final
| 
| align=center| 2
| align=center| 3:05
| Grozny, Chechnya, Russia
| 
|-
| Win
| align=center| 29–4–1
| Luciano Palhano
| Decision (unanimous)
| WFCA 22: Grand Prix Akhmat 
| 
| align=center| 3
| align=center| 5:00
| Grozny, Chechnya, Russia
| 
|-
| Win
| align=center| 28–4–1
| Rodrigo Caporal
| Decision (unanimous)
| WFCA 16: Grand Prix Akhmat 
| 
| align=center| 3
| align=center| 5:00
| Grozny, Chechnya, Russia
| 
|-
| Loss
| align=center| 27–4–1
| Yasubey Enomoto
| Submission (guillotine choke)
| World FC Akhmat: Grozny Fights 9
| 
| align=center| 3
| align=center| 2:28
| Grozny, Chechnya, Russia
| 
|-
| Win
| align=center| 27–3–1
| Hermes França
| KO (punch)
| World FC Akhmat: Grozny Fights 3
| 
| align=center| 1
| align=center| 0:42
| Grozny, Chechnya, Russia
| 
|-
| Win
| align=center| 26–3–1
| Sergey Faley
| Decision (unanimous)
| Octagon Fighting Sensation 3
| 
| align=center| 3
| align=center| 5:00
| Yaroslavl, Yaroslavl Oblast, Russia
| 
|-
| Win
| align=center| 25–3–1
| Luiz Ricardo Simon
| KO (punches)
| New Stream
| 
| align=center| 2
| align=center| 1:12
| Moscow, Moscow Oblast, Russia
| 
|-
| Win
| align=center| 24–3–1
| Davlat Alimov
| TKO (punches)
| Octagon Fighting Sensation 1
| 
| align=center| 3
| align=center| 1:18
| Yaroslavl, Yaroslavl Oblast, Russia
| 
|-
| Win
| align=center| 23–3–1
| Renat Lyatifov
| Decision (unanimous)
| MMA Star in the Ring - Shamil vs. Renat
| 
| align=center| 3
| align=center| 5:00
| Makhachkala, Republic of Dagestan, Russia
| 
|-
| Win
| align=center| 22–3–1
| Harun Kina
| Decision (unanimous)
| Fight Nights - Battle on Terek 1
| 
| align=center| 3
| align=center| 5:00
| Grozny, Chechnya, Russia
| 
|-
| Loss
| align=center| 21–3–1
| Yasubey Enomoto
| Decision (unanimous)
| Fight Nights - Battle of Moscow 12
| 
| align=center| 3
| align=center| 5:00
| Moscow, Moscow Oblast, Russia
| 
|-
| Win
| align=center| 21–2–1
| Eduardo Pachu
| TKO (punches)
| Fight Nights - Battle of Moscow 11
| 
| align=center| 1
| align=center| 3:24
| Moscow, Moscow Oblast, Russia
| 
|-
| Win
| align=center| 20–2–1
| Juha-Pekka Vainikainen
| Decision (unanimous)
| Battle of the Stars 1
| 
| align=center| 3
| align=center| 5:00
| Kaspiysk, Dagestan, Russia
| 
|-
| Win
| align=center| 19–2–1
| Anatoly Safronov
| TKO (kick to the body and punches)
| League S-70: Russian Championship Third Round
| 
| align=center| 1
| align=center| 1:34
| Moscow, Russia
| 
|-
| Draw
| align=center| 18–2–1
| Alexander Yakovlev
| Draw (majority)
| M-1 Challenge 31
| 
| align=center| 3
| align=center| 5:00
| St. Petersburg, Russia
| 
|-
| Loss
| align=center| 18–2
| Yasubey Enomoto
| Submission (guillotine choke)
| M-1 Challenge 30: Zavurov vs. Enomoto
| 
| align=center| 5
| align=center| 4:10
| Costa Mesa, California, United States
| 
|-
| Win
| align=center| 18–1
| Zhanybek Amatov
| TKO (foot injury)
| Fight Nights: Battle of Moscow 4
| 
| align=center| 2
| align=center| 1:34
| Moscow, Russia
| 
|-
| Win
| align=center| 17–1
| Yasubey Enomoto
| Decision (unanimous)
| M-1 Challenge 25: Zavurov vs. Enomoto
| 
| align=center| 5
| align=center| 5:00
| St. Petersburg, Russia
| 
|-
| Win
| align=center| 16–1
| Yuri Izotov
| Decision (unanimous)
| Lipetsk Mix Federation: Russian Cities Tournament
| 
| align=center| 3
| align=center| 5:00
| Lipetsk, Russia
| 
|-
| Win
| align=center| 15–1
| Tom Gallicchio
| TKO (strikes)
| M-1 Challenge 23: Guram vs. Grishin
| 
| align=center| 2
| align=center| 1:11
| Moscow, Russia
| 
|-
| Win
| align=center| 14–1
| Abner Lloveras
| TKO (strikes)
| M-1 Challenge 22: Narkun vs. Vasilevsky
| 
| align=center| 4
| align=center| 4:22
| Moscow, Russia
| 
|-
| Win
| align=center| 13–1
| Jaroslav Poborsky
| TKO (punches)
| Heroes Gate 2
| 
| align=center| 1
| align=center| 2:50
| Prague, Czech Republic
| 
|-
| Win
| align=center| 12–1
| Vener Galiev
| Decision (unanimous)
| Fight Nights: Battle of Moscow 2
| 
| align=center| 2
| align=center| 5:00
| Moscow, Russia
| 
|-
| Win
| align=center| 11–1
| Vasily Novikov
| Submission (rear-naked choke)
| Fight Nights: Battle of Moscow 2
| 
| align=center| 1
| align=center| 2:53
| Moscow, Russia
| 
|-
| Win
| align=center| 10–1
| Vladimir Katyihin
| Decision (unanimous)
| ProFC: Union Nation Cup 8
| 
| align=center| 2
| align=center| 5:00
| 
| 
|-
| Win
| align=center| 9–1
| Frodo Khasbulaev
| Submission (rear-naked choke)
| M-1 Selection 2010: Eastern Europe Finals
| 
| align=center| 1
| align=center| 3:16
| Moscow, Russia
| 
|-
| Win
| align=center| 8–1
| Ramazan Abdulzhalilov
| Decision (unanimous)
| M-1 Selection 2010: Eastern Europe Round 3
| 
| align=center| 3
| align=center| 5:00
| Kyiv, Ukraine 
| 
|-
| Win
| align=center| 7–1
| Radik Iboyan
| TKO (punches)
| M-1 Selection 2010: Eastern Europe Round 2
| 
| align=center| 2
| align=center| 3:54
| Kyiv, Ukraine
| 
|-
| Win
| align=center| 6–1
| Seydina Seck
| Decision (unanimous)
| Saturn & RusFighters: Battle of Gladiators
| 
| align=center| 3
| align=center| 5:00
| Omsk, Russia
| 
|-
| Loss
| align=center| 5–1
| Rashid Magomedov
| Decision (split)
| M-1 Challenge: 2009 Selections 9
| 
| align=center| 3
| align=center| 5:00
| St. Petersburg, Russia
| 
|-
| Win
| align=center| 5–0
| Aleksey Gonchar
| Submission (armbar)
| CSFU: Champions League
| 
| align=center| 2
| align=center| 3:50
| Poltava, Ukraine
| 
|-
| Win
| align=center| 4–0
| Hamiz Mamedov
| Decision (unanimous)
| Mission of Peace: Martial Arts Festival
| 
| align=center| 3
| align=center| 3:00
| Ekaterinburg, Russia
| 
|-
| Win
| align=center| 3–0
| Mukhamed Aushev
| KO (punches)
| Combat Fighting Federation: International MMA Tournament
| 
| align=center| 3
| align=center| 2:59
| Tyumen, Russia
| 
|-
| Win
| align=center| 2–0
| Vitaly Gogishvilli
| Submission (rear-naked choke)
| Mixfight Georgia: Georgia vs. Russia
| 
| align=center| 1
| align=center| 2:05
| Tbilisi, Georgia
| 
|-
| Win
| align=center| 1–0
| Magomed Kurmagomedov
| Submission (armbar)
| Extreme FC: Octagon 3
| 
| align=center| 2
| align=center| 1:20
| Odessa, Ukraine
| 

Except where otherwise indicated, details provided in the record box are taken from Sherdog

References

External links
 
 
 
 Shamil Zavurov at Road FC

1984 births
Living people
Russian male mixed martial artists
Dagestani mixed martial artists
Welterweight mixed martial artists
Russian sambo practitioners
Russian sanshou practitioners
Mixed martial artists utilizing sambo
Mixed martial artists utilizing sanshou
Mixed martial artists utilizing freestyle wrestling
Sportspeople from Dagestan